Lews Castle (Scottish Gaelic: Caisteal Leòdhais) is a Victorian era castle located west of the town of Stornoway, Isle of Lewis, Scotland.  It was built in the years 1844–51 as a country house for Sir James Matheson who had bought the whole island a few years previously with his fortune from the Chinese Opium trade. It was designed by the Glasgow architect Charles Wilson.

In 1918, the Lews Estate, including the castle, was bought by industrialist Lord Leverhulme from the Matheson family.  He gave the castle to the people of Stornoway parish in 1923.

During the Second World War the Castle was taken over as accommodation for air and ground crew of 700 Naval Air Squadron, who operated a detachment of six Supermarine Walrus aircraft from a slipway at Cuddy Point in the Grounds. The base was referred to as HMS Mentor.

After the war, the Castle was used for accommodation for students of Lews Castle College in the 1950s. After the accommodation closed, the building was left disused for several decades.

The building, which is protected as a category A listed building, is now owned by the local council, Comhairle nan Eilean Siar. On 22 November 2011 Lews Castle was awarded £4.6 million by the Heritage Lottery Fund to enable it to be converted into a bilingual museum and cultural centre. In 2016, the ground floor of the castle reopened to the public, including a restored ballroom and a cafe. In 2017, Natural Retreats, a luxury holiday property company, opened apartments in the castle.

References

External links
 Lews Castle's official website
 Overview of Lews Castle from The Gazetteer for Scotland
 History from Stornoway Historical Society

Buildings and structures in the Isle of Lewis
Castles in the Outer Hebrides
Houses completed in 1857
Category A listed buildings in the Outer Hebrides
Listed houses in Scotland
Inventory of Gardens and Designed Landscapes
Country houses in the Outer Hebrides
Stornoway
1857 establishments in Scotland